Federal Highway 190 (Carretera Federal 190) is a Federal Highway of Mexico. Federal Highway 190 is split into two segments: the first segment travels from Tehuantepec, Oaxaca in the east to Puebla City, Puebla in the west. The second segment travels from La Ventosa, Juchitán de Zaragoza Municipality, Oaxaca in the west eastward to Ciudad Cuauhtémoc, Chiapas. Fed. Highway 190's eastern segment ends at a Guatemala-Mexico border crossing at Ciudad Cuauhtémoc. The Pan-American Highway route in southern Mexico continues into Guatemala as Central American Highway 1 (CA-1).

In its capacity as the Pan-American Highway, it is a major route for migrants traveling north from Central America. It was the site of the tragic Chiapas truck crash in 2021, which killed 55 migrants and injured more than 100 migrants, mostly Guatemalans heading to the United States, between the towns of Chiapa de Corzo and Tuxtla Gutiérrez in Chiapas. The migrants were hiding in a container at the back of the truck.

References

190